KCLR (branded as La Nueva Radio Cristiana) was a radio station serving the Lubbock, Texas metropolitan area with a Spanish language Christian talk radio format.  The station broadcast on AM frequency 1530 kHz and was last under the ownership of Paulino Bernal Evangelism. Bernal surrendered the license for KCLR and five other stations to the Federal Communications Commission on November 7, 2013.

The station was founded in 1963 by Phil Crenshaw and Gaylon O. Gilbert. The original power of that station was 1,000 watts, with power being raised to 5,000 watts non-critical hours (two hours after sunrise and two hours before sunset) in 1968. The original owners sold the station to F.T. Wilson in 1969, who then sold the station to Pete C. Rodriguez in 1978. Rodriguez himself later sold the station to Paulino Bernal, the most recent owner, in 1990.

Because it shared the same frequency as Clear Channel station WCKY in Cincinnati, Ohio, KCLR operated only during the daytime hours. The station sought the letters KCLR, or KCLeaR because of its placement on a clear channel.

External links

CLR
Radio stations established in 1963
1963 establishments in Texas
Defunct radio stations in the United States
Radio stations disestablished in 2013
Defunct religious radio stations in the United States
2013 disestablishments in Texas
CLR
CLR